Jang Sung-kyu (born April 21, 1983) is a South Korean host and television personality. He was formerly a news announcer for JTBC until March 2019. He is currently signed to JTBC Studios, a subsidiary company under JTBC, working as a freelancer and currently stars in YouTube variety show Workman.

Philanthropy 
On March 8, 2022, Jang donated  million won to the Disaster Relief Association to help the victims of the massive wildfire that started in Uljin, Gyeongbuk and has spread to Samcheok, Gangwon. Jang additionally donated  million to the Ukrainian Embassy in South Korea to assist Ukrainian victims in the ongoing Russian invasion.

On February 8, 2023, Jang donated 23 million KRW through YouTube  to help 2023 Turkey–Syria earthquake, by donating money through the Turkey and Syria Recovery Fund.

Filmography

Variety shows

Current

Former

News

Web shows

Hosting

Radio Show

Discography

Singles

As lead artist

Awards and nominations

Listicles

Notes

References

South Korean television presenters
1983 births
People from Seoul
Living people